Brough is a hamlet in Nottinghamshire, England.

Location
It is located in the Newark and Sherwood District, 5 miles (8 km) to the north of Newark-on-Trent, on the A46 Fosse Way. Its population is included in the adjacent civil parish of Collingham.

History
Brough stands on the site of the Roman town of Crococalana, which grew around a military fort in the 1st century AD. The town spread along the Roman Fosse Way for about a mile, and had ditched defences.

Brough Methodist Chapel is now permanently closed.

References

External links

Hamlets in Nottinghamshire
Newark and Sherwood